Gymnobela subaraneosa is a species of sea snail, a marine gastropod mollusk in the family Raphitomidae.

References
Citations

Bibliography
  Gofas, S.; Le Renard, J.; Bouchet, P. (2001). Mollusca. in: Costello, M.J. et al. (eds), European Register of Marine Species: a check-list of the marine species in Europe and a bibliography of guides to their identification. Patrimoines Naturels. 50: 180-213.
 Sysoev A.V. (2014). Deep-sea fauna of European seas: An annotated species check-list of benthic invertebrates living deeper than 2000 m in the seas bordering Europe. Gastropoda. Invertebrate Zoology. Vol.11. No.1: 134–155

External links
 Dautzenberg P. & Fischer H. (1896). Dragages effectués par l'Hirondelle et par la Princesse Alice 1888-1895. 1. Mollusques Gastropodes. Mémoires de la Société Zoologique de France 9: 395-498, pl. 15-22
Bouchet &  Warren, Revision of the North-East Atlantic bathyal and abyssal Turridae (Mollusca, Gastropoda); The Journal of Molluscan Studies, supplement 8, December 1980
  Serge GOFAS, Ángel A. LUQUE, Joan Daniel OLIVER,José TEMPLADO & Alberto SERRA (2021) - The Mollusca of Galicia Bank (NE Atlantic Ocean); European Journal of Taxonomy 785: 1–114
 Gastropods.com: Gymnobela subaraneosa
 

subaraneosa
Gastropods described in 1896